Harry Purdy may refer to: 

Harry Purdy (footballer, born 1867) (1867–1922), Australian rules footballer for South Melbourne between 1897 and 1901
Harry Purdy (footballer, born 1898) (1898–1978), Australian rules footballer for South Melbourne in 1917 and 1919